A metallodendrimer is a type of dendrimer with incorporated metal atoms. The development of this type of material is actively pursued in academia.

Structure
The metal can be situated in the repeat unit, the core or at the extremities as end-group. Elements often encountered are palladium and platinum. These metals can form octahedral six-coordinate M(IV) linking units from organic dihalides and the corresponding 4-coordinate M(II) monomers. Ferrocene-containing dendrimers and dendrimers with cobaltocene and arylchromiumtricarbonyl units have been reported in end-functional dendrimers.

Metallodendrimers can form as metal complexes with dendritic counter ions for example by hydrolysis of ester terminated PAMAM dendrimers with sodium hydroxide.

Applications
Metallodendrimers are investigated as equivalents to nanoparticles. Applications can be expected in the fields of catalysis, as chemical sensors in molecular recognition - for example of bromine and chloride anions  - or as materials capable of binding metals. Metallodendrimers can also mimic certain biomolecules for example haemoprotein in dendrimer with a porphyrin core. Further uses are reported as electrocatalyst.

Examples of metallodendrimer heterogeneous catalysis are a nickel-containing dendrimer active in the Kharasch addition, palladium-containing dendrimers active in ethylene  polymerization and in the Heck reaction.

References

Organometallic chemistry
Dendrimers